Inocybe tristis is a species of agaric fungus in the family Inocybaceae native to Israel. It is poisonous.

See also
 List of Inocybe species

References

tristis
Fungi described in 1930
Fungi of Western Asia